The Beat Goes On is the first Korean extended play (EP) of South Korean pop duo Super Junior-D&E, a subgroup of the boy band Super Junior. The album was released on March 9, 2015 under SM Entertainment.

Background
Super Junior-D&E released short snippets and teaser videos of their music video for Growing Pains on March 2 and 3, 2015. On 4 March, Donghae and Eunhyuk shared snippets of all the songs on their unit group album, The Beat Goes On. The medley included pieces of the seven tracks on the album, including the title song, Growing Pains. Donghae participated in the album production along with producers The Underdogs, Hitchhiker, NoizeBank and more. The showcase for The Beat Goes On took place at the SMTOWN Coex Artium on March 5 and the album released online on March 6 and offline on March 9.

They released the special edition album of The Beat Goes On on March 23, 2015. Including the seven tracks in the original album, Super Junior-D&E added on Oppa Oppa, 1+1=LOVE, Still You, Motorcycle, Love That I Need, and I Wanna Dance from its previous digital singles and Korean versions of Japanese hit songs for a total of 13 tracks in the special edition album.

Track listing

Charts

Album chart

Weekly chart

Year-end chart

Single chart

Album sales

Awards and nominations

Music program awards

Release history

References

External links
 Official Korean SM Entertainment website of Super Junior Donghae & Eunhyuk

2015 EPs
Super Junior albums
SM Entertainment EPs
Korean-language EPs